Balaca Həmyə (also, Baladzha-Gam’ya and Kichik Gam’ya) is a village and municipality in the Siazan Rayon of Azerbaijan.  It has a population of 934.

References 

Populated places in Siyazan District